Norman "Norm" Mingay (11 July 1899 – 9 September 1955) was a rugby union player who represented Australia.

Mingay, a scrum-half, was born in Sydney, and won seven international rugby caps for Australia.

References

Australian rugby union players
Australia international rugby union players
1899 births
1955 deaths
Rugby union players from Sydney
Rugby union scrum-halves